River Street Firehouse is an historic firehouse at 176 River Street in Cambridge, Massachusetts.  It is a two-story brick building, with a hip roof and two vehicle bays.  It was designed by local architect George Fogerty in the Queen Anne style, and was completed in 1890.  It has short towers with pyramidal roofs at the front corners, and has decorative herringbone brickwork.  The building was listed on the National Register of Historic Places in 1982.

The firehouse has been the home of Engine 6 of the Cambridge Fire Department since the building's construction.

See also
National Register of Historic Places listings in Cambridge, Massachusetts

References

Fire stations completed in 1890
Fire stations on the National Register of Historic Places in Massachusetts
Buildings and structures in Cambridge, Massachusetts
National Register of Historic Places in Cambridge, Massachusetts